Congregation Shaarie Torah Cemetery is an historic Jewish cemetery in southeast Portland, Oregon's Brentwood-Darlington neighborhood, in the United States.

History
In 2003, the cemetery was desecrated by a self-described white supremacist and one other person.

See also

 Beth Israel Cemetery (Portland, Oregon) 
 Congregation Shaarie Torah
 Judaism in Oregon

References

External links
 

Brentwood-Darlington, Portland, Oregon
Cemeteries in Portland, Oregon
Cemetery vandalism and desecration
Jewish cemeteries in Oregon
Jews and Judaism in Portland, Oregon